The 1926–27 City Cup was the twenty-ninth edition of the City Cup, a cup competition in Northern Irish football.

The tournament was won by Linfield for the 13th time.

Group standings

References

1926–27 in Northern Ireland association football